
Gmina Wieliczki is a rural gmina (administrative district) in Olecko County, Warmian-Masurian Voivodeship, in northern Poland.

Villages
Gmina Wieliczki contains the villages and settlements of Bartki, Bartkowski Dwór, Cimochy, Cimoszki, Gąsiorówko, Gąsiorowo, Godziejewo, Guty, Jelitki, Kleszczewo, Krupin, Krzyżewko, Małe Olecko, Markowskie, Niedźwiedzkie, Nory, Nowe Raczki, Nowy Młyn, Puchówka, Rynie, Sobole, Starosty, Szeszki, Urbanki, Wieliczki, Wilkasy and Wojnasy.

Neighbouring gminas
Gmina Wieliczki is bordered by the gminas of Bakałarzewo, Kalinowo, Olecko and Raczki.

References
Polish official population figures 2006

Wieliczki
Olecko County